The 2nd constituency of Martinique is a French legislative constituency in the Martinique département.

Deputies

Election results

2022

 
 
|-
| colspan="8" bgcolor="#E9E9E9"|
|-

2017

Miscellaneous Left hold

2012

Sources and references
 French Interior Ministry results website: 
 

2